J. Kenneth Grider (October 22, 1921 – December 6, 2006) was a Nazarene Christian theologian and former seminary professor primarily associated with the followers of John Wesley who are part of the Holiness movement.

Biography

Early life 
J. Kenneth Grider was born October 22, 1921, in Madison, IL to William Sanford and Elizabeth (Krone) Grider. In 1948, he got a M.A. from the Drew University, Madison, New Jersey in 1950. In 1947, he graduated from the Nazarene Theological Seminary. He received his PhD from the University of Glasgow in 1952.

Career 
Grider was a distinguished visiting Professor of theology at Olivet Nazarene University in Bourbonnais, IL, and professor of theology emeritus at Nazarene Theological Seminary, Kansas City. He taught courses in Hurlet Nazarene College (Scotland), Point Loma Nazarene University, Olivet Nazarene University, Southern Nazarene University, Asia-Pacific Nazarene Theological Seminary, and extension courses in Mexico and the Philippines.

He was an ordained elder in the Church of the Nazarene.

He was one of the translators of the New International Version of the Bible, working at two committee levels on six New Testament books. His "magnum opus" is the systematic theology A Wesleyan-Holiness Theology (1994). He also wrote over 2,000 poems, articles, commentaries, essays, and lessons and contributed to numerous symposia. He was the editor of The Seminary Tower for 36 years.

Theology
Grider had Arminian soteriological views in the Wesleyan tradition, and was a supporter of the governmental theory of atonement view.

Death
Grider died December 6, 2006, in Chandler, AZ.

Awards
In 1966, Grider received the Olivet Nazarene University's Clergy Alumnus of the Year award. In 1991, he received an honorary Doctor of Divinity degree from the Olivet Nazarene University. In 1999, he received the Lifetime Achievement Award of the Wesleyan Theological Society.

Publications

Books

Chapters

Articles

Notes and references

Citations

Sources

External links

1921 births
2006 deaths
20th-century American theologians
Translators of the Bible into English
American Christian theologians
American members of the Church of the Nazarene
Arminian theologians
Nazarene theologians
Nazarene Theological Seminary alumni
Olivet Nazarene University alumni
Olivet Nazarene University faculty
Systematic theologians